This list of butterflies of Jamaica lists butterflies recorded from the island of Jamaica.

The list is most likely incomplete. There is also a list of moths of Jamaica.

Papilionidae

Papilioninae
Battus polydamas jamaicensis, gold rim swallowtail (Rothschild & Jordan, 1906)
Eurytides marcellinus (Doubleday, [1845])
Papilio demoleus demoleus, lime swallowtail Linnaeus, 1758
Papilio homerus Fabricius, 1793
Papilio melonius Rothschild & Jordan, 1906
Papilio thersites Fabricius, 1775
Papilio andraemon andraemon, Bahamian swallowtail (Hübner, [1823])
Papilio pelaus pelaus, prickly ash swallowtail Fabricius, 1775

Hesperiidae

Eudaminae

Aguna asander jasper Evans, 1952
Astraptes anaphus anausis (Godman & Salvin, 1896)
Astraptes jaira (Butler, 1870)
Astraptes talus (Cramer, 1777)
Cabares potrillo potrillo (Lucas, 1857)
Chioides churchi E. Bell & W. Comstock, 1948
Epargyreus antaeus (Hewitson, 1867)
Phocides lincea perkinsi (Kaye, 1931)
Polygonus leo hagar Evans, 1952
Proteides mercurius jamaicensis, mercurial skipper Skinner, 1920

Pyrginae

Anastrus sempiternus dilloni (E. Bell & W. Comstock, 1948)
Eantis mithridates (Fabricius, 1793)
Ephyriades arcas philemon (Fabricius, 1775)
Ephyriades brunnea jamaicensis (Möschler, 1879)
Gesta gesta (Herrich-Schäffer, 1863)
Grais stigmaticus juncta Evans, 1953
Pyrgus oileus, tropical checkered skipper (Linnaeus, 1767)
Timochares runia Evans, 1953
Urbanus proteus, common long-tailed skipper (Linnaeus 1758)

Hesperiinae

Choranthus lilliae E. Bell, 1931
Cymaenes tripunctus tripunctus (Herrich-Schäffer, 1865)
Euphyes singularis insolata, Butler's branded skipper (Butler, 1878)
Nyctelius nyctelius nyctelius (Latreille, [1824])
Panoquina ocola ocola (W. H. Edwards, 1863)
Perichares philetes (Gmelin, [1790])
Pyrrhocalles jamaicensis, Schaus's skipper (Schaus, 1902)
Rhinthon cubana cubana, branded skipper (Herrich-Schäffer, 1865)
Synapte malitiosa malitiosa (Herrich-Schäffer, 1865)
Troyus turneri Warren & Turland 2012
Wallengrenia vesuria (Plötz, 1882)

Pieridae

Coliadinae
Abaeis nicippe (Cramer, 1779)
Anteos clorinde (Godart, [1824])
Anteos maerula maerula, yellow angled-sulphur (Fabricius, 1775)
Aphrissa godartiana hartonia (Butler, 1870)
Aphrissa statira cubana d'Almeida, 1939
Eurema adamsi (Lathy, 1898)
Eurema boisduvaliana (C. Felder & R. Felder, 1865)
Kricogonia lyside (Godart, 1819)
Nathalis iole iole Boisduval, 1836
Phoebis argante comstocki Avinoff, 1944
Pyrisitia dina parvumbra (Kaye, 1925)
Pyrisitia lisa euterpe, little sulphur (Ménétriés, 1832)
Pyrisitia messalina (Fabricius, 1785)
Pyrisitia nise nise, mimosa yellow (Cramer, 1775)
Pyrisitia proterpia proterpia, proterpia orange, tailed orange (Fabricius, 1775)

Pierinae
Ganyra josephina paramaryllis (W. Comstock, 1943)
Appias drusilla castalia, Jamaican albatross (Fabricius, 1793)

Lycaenidae

Theclinae
Chlorostrymon orbis K. Johnson & D. Smith, 1993
Chlorostrymon simaethis jago (W. Comstock & Huntington, 1943)
Cyanophrys crethona (Hewitson, 1874)
Cyanophrys hartii T. Turner & J. Miller, 1992
Electrostrymon angelia pantoni (W. Comstock & Huntington, 1943)
Electrostrymon pan (Drury, 1773)
Nesiostrymon shoumatoffi (W. Comstock & Huntington, 1943)
Rekoa bourkei (Kaye, [1925])
Strymon acis gossei (W. Comstock & Huntington, 1943)
Strymon bazochii gundlachianus M. Bates, 1935
Strymon istapa cybira (Hewitson, 1874)
Strymon limenia (Hewitson, 1868)
Strymon martialis (Herrich-Schäffer, 1864)

Polyommatinae

Brephidium exilis isophthalma (Herrich-Schäffer, 1862)
Cyclargus dominica (Möschler, 1886)
Cyclargus shuturn K. Johnson & Bálint, 1995
Hemiargus ceraunus ceraunus (Fabricius, 1793)
Leptotes cassius theonus, Cassius blue(Lucas, 1857)
Leptotes perkinsae Kaye, 1931

Nymphalidae

Libytheinae
Libytheana terena (Godart, 1819)

Danainae
Anetia jaegeri (Ménétriés, 1832)
Danaus cleophile (Godart, 1819)
Danaus eresimus tethys W. Forbes, [1944]
Danaus gilippus jamaicensis (H. Bates, 1864)
Danaus plexippus megalippe (Hübner, [1826])
Greta diaphanus diaphanus (Drury, 1773)
Lycorea halia cleobaea (Godart, 1819)

Heliconiinae

Agraulis vanilla insularis, Gulf fritillary, silver-spotted flambeau (Linnaeus, 1758)
Dryas iulia delila, Julia butterfly (Fabricius, 1775)
Euptoieta claudia, variegated fritillary (Cramer, 1775)
Euptoieta hegesia hegesia, tropical fritillary (Cramer, 1779)
Heliconius charithonia simulator, zebra heliconian longwing Röber, 1921

Limenitidinae
Adelpha abyla (Hewitson, 1850)

Apaturinae
Doxocopa laure laura (Hübner, 1823])

Biblidinae

Eunica monima (Stoll, 1782)
Eunica tatila tatilista Kaye, 1926
Dynamine serina serina (Fabricius, 1775)
Hamadryas amphichloe diasia (Fruhstorfer, 1916)
Lucinia cadma (Drury, 1773)
Mestra dorcas dorcas, Jamaican mestra(Fabricius, 1775)

Cyrestinae
Marpesia chiron (Fabricius, 1775)
Marpesia eleuchea pellenis (Godart, [1824])

Nymphalinae

Anartia jatrophae jamaicensis, Jamaican white peacock Möschler, 1886
Anthanassa frisia frisia, Cuban crescentspot (Poey, 1832)
Antillea pelops pygmaea (Godart, 1819)
Antillea proclea (Doubleday, [1847])
Atlantea pantoni (Kaye, 1906)
Colobura dirce wolcotti W. Comstock, 1942
Historis acheronta cadmus (Cramer, 1775)
Hypanartia paullus (Fabricius, 1793)
Junonia evarete zonalis, tropical buckeye C. Felder & R. Felder, [1867]
Junonia genoveva, mangrove buckeye (Cramer, 1780)
Siproeta stelenes stelenes, Antillean malachite (Linnaeus, 1758)
Vanessa atalanta rubria, red admiral (Fruhstorfer, 1909)
Vanessa virginiensis, American painted lady (Drury, 1773)

Charaxinae
Anaea troglodyta portia, Jamaican tropical leafwing (Fabricius, 1775)
Fountainea johnsoni (Avinoff & Shoumatoff, 1941)

Satyrinae
Calisto zangis (Fabricius, 1775)

References
F. Martin Brown and Bernard Heineman, Jamaica and its Butterflies (E. W. Classey, London 1972)
Norman D. Riley, A Field Guide to the Butterflies of the West Indies (Collins, 1975) 
Eric Garraway and Audette Bailey, Butterflies of Jamaica (Macmillan Caribbean Natural History, 2005)
Interactive Listing of American Butterflies (from Alaska to Panama and the Caribbean)
Finnish University and Research Network Markku Savela's Lepidoptera and Some Other Life Forms

 01
Lepidoptera
Jam
Lepidoptera